J.J.! is an album by jazz trombonist and arranger J. J. Johnson and Big Band recorded in 1964 for the RCA Victor label.

Reception

The Allmusic site awarded the album 4 stars.

Track listing
 "El Camino Real" (J. J. Johnson) - 4:10
 "Stolen Moments" (Oliver Nelson) - 5:50
 "Train Samba" (Gary McFarland) - 6:50
 "Swing Spring" (Miles Davis) - 3:45
 "Bimsha Swing" (Thelonious Monk, Denzil Best) - 3:10
 "My Little Suede Shoes" (Charlie Parker) - 4:55
 "So What" (Davis) - 4:15
 "Stratusphunk" (George Russell) - 6:50
 "Winter's Waif" (McFarland) - 5:50
Recorded at Webster Hall in New York City on December 7, 1964 (tracks 5-8), December 8, 1964 (tracks 2 & 4) and December 9, 1964 (tracks 1, 3 & 9)

Personnel 
J. J. Johnson - trombone, arranger
Thad Jones (tracks 1-4 & 9), Jimmy Maxwell (tracks 1, 3 & 9), Ernie Royal, Clark Terry (tracks 5-8), Joe Wilder (tracks 1, 3 & 9) - trumpet
Jimmy Cleveland - trombone
Tommy Mitchell (tracks 1, 3 & 9), Tony Studd – bass trombone
James Buffington - French horn (tracks 1, 3 & 9)
Bill Stanley - tuba (tracks 1, 3 & 9)
Ray Beckenstein (tracks 2 & 4), Jerry Dodgion, Harvey Estrin (tracks 1, 3 & 9), Bud Johnson (tracks 1, 3 & 9), Oliver Nelson, Jerome Richardson (tracks 5-8) - reeds
Hank Jones - piano
Bob Cranshaw - bass
Grady Tate - drums

References 

1965 albums
RCA Records albums
J. J. Johnson albums